Open-source films (also known as open-content films and free-content films) are films which are produced and distributed by using free and open-source and open content methodologies. Their sources are freely available and the licenses used meet the demands of the Open Source Initiative (OSI) in terms of freedom.

Definition 
A definition of an open-source film is based on the OSI's open-source software definition and the definition of free cultural licenses. This definition can be applied to films where:

 The license of the movie is approved for free cultural works. Specifically this is true for the Creative Commons licenses by and by-sa.
 The materials used in the movie (sources) are also available under a license which is approved for free cultural works.
 The movie and its sources are made publicly available via an online download or by other means that are either free or with a cost that covers reasonable reproduction expenses only.
 The sources should be viewable and editable with free/open-source software. If this is not the case they must be convertible into such a format by using free/open-source software. The same applies to the movie itself.
 It should be possible to re-create or re-assemble the movie using the source materials.

Films or film projects which do not meet these criteria are either not open source or partially open source.

List of open-source films

Further reading

See also 

 Filmmaking
 Free video
 Open content
 Open source

References 

Film production
Independent films